Year 152 (CLII) was a leap year starting on Friday (link will display the full calendar) of the Julian calendar. At the time, it was known as the Year of the Consulship of Glabrio and Homullus (or, less frequently, year 905 Ab urbe condita). The denomination 152 for this year has been used since the early medieval period, when the Anno Domini calendar era became the prevalent method in Europe for naming years.

Events 
 By place 

 Asia 
 The Chinese domination of the Tarim Basin weakens.

Births 
 Bao Xin, Chinese general and warlord (d. 192)

Deaths 
 January 14 – Markianos, patriarch of Alexandria
 Yan Ming, Chinese empress of the Han Dynasty

References